Within the European Union, Directorates-General are departments with specific zones of responsibility, the equivalent of ministries at a national level. Most are headed by a European Commissioner, responsible for the general direction of the Directorate-General, and in charge of (i.e. politically responsible for) the corresponding policy area; and a Director-General, responsible for the management of day-to-day affairs, who reports to the European Commissioner.

 The Secretariat of the European Parliament: Parliament Directorates-General.
 The General Secretariat of the Council of the European Union: Council Directorates-general.

The European Patent Office (part of the European Patent Organisation, separate from the EU) also has Directorates-General, which are administrative groupings of departments.

Directorates-General of the European Commission
The Directorates-General of the European Commission are divided into four groups: Policy DGs, External relations DGs, General Service DGs and Internal Service DGs. Internally, the DGs are referred to by their abbreviations, provided below.

See also
 List of European Commission committees by Directorates-General
 European Civil Service
 Joint Research Centre (European Commission)
 Permanent Secretary
 Council of the European Union

References